The 2020 Major League Baseball First-Year Player Draft took place on June 10 and 11, 2020. The draft assigned amateur baseball players to Major League Baseball (MLB) teams. The draft order was set based on the reverse order of the 2019 MLB season standings. In addition, compensation picks were distributed for players who did not sign from the 2019 MLB draft and for teams who lost qualifying free agents. On March 26, 2020, MLB and the MLBPA reached a deal that included the option to shorten the draft to five rounds, and also shorten the 2021 draft to 20 rounds due to the COVID-19 pandemic. In a plan to allow teams to sign an unlimited number of undrafted players for $20,000 each, MLB ultimately opted to shorten the 2020 draft to five rounds. The draft was originally planned to be hosted live for the first time in Omaha, Nebraska, to accompany the since-cancelled 2020 College World Series. However, due to the COVID-19 pandemic, the draft was instead held remotely from MLB Network's studios in Secaucus, New Jersey. With sponsorship from T-Mobile, the event was officially the 2020 MLB Draft Presented by T-Mobile, with ESPN providing live coverage for the first time since 2008, alongside MLB Network.

The Detroit Tigers, who had the worst record of the 2019 MLB season, selected Spencer Torkelson with the first overall pick in the draft. As punishment for their role in the sign stealing scandal, the Houston Astros forfeited their first- and second-round picks in the draft. The Boston Red Sox also forfeited their second-round pick in the draft as punishment for their own sign-stealing violations. Among the selected players, there were 41 who had played for the United States national baseball team and 2 who had played for the Canada national baseball team.

On September 18, 2020, the Chicago White Sox promoted Garrett Crochet to the major leagues, becoming the first MLB player in six years to reach the big leagues in the same year in which he was drafted.

Draft selections

First round

Competitive Balance Round A

Second round

Competitive Balance Round B

Compensatory round

Third round

Fourth round

Fifth round

Summary

Selections by school and conference or state/province

Selections by position

Schools with multiple draft selections

Notes
Compensation picks

Trades

Further reading

References

Major League Baseball draft
Draft
Major League Baseball draft
Major League Baseball draft
Baseball in New Jersey
Events in New Jersey
Sports in Hudson County, New Jersey
Secaucus, New Jersey
Baseball in Omaha, Nebraska
Major League Baseball draft
Major League Baseball draft